Muhammad Akhlaq is a Pakistani politician who was the Provincial Minister of Punjab for Special Education, in office from 13 September 2018 till April 2022. He had been a member of the Provincial Assembly of the Punjab from August 2018 till January 2023.

Early life and education
He was born on 1 May 1956 in Sialkot, Pakistan.

He holds a degree of Bachelor of Commerce.

Political career
He was elected to the Provincial Assembly of the Punjab as a candidate of Pakistan Muslim League (N) (PML-N) from Constituency PP-122 (Sialkot-II) in 2008 Pakistani general election. He received 33,959 votes and defeated Raja Amer Khan, a candidate of Pakistan Peoples Party (PPP). In September 2012, The Supreme Court of Pakistan disqualified him as Member of the Punjab Assembly.

He was re-elected to the Provincial Assembly of the Punjab as a candidate of Pakistan Tehreek-e-Insaf from Constituency PP-36 (Sialkot-II) in 2018 Pakistani general election.

On 12 September 2018, he was inducted into the provincial Punjab cabinet of Chief Minister Sardar Usman Buzdar. On 13 September 2018, he was appointed Provincial Minister of Punjab for Special Education.

References

Living people
Punjab MPAs 2018–2023
Pakistan Tehreek-e-Insaf MPAs (Punjab)
Provincial ministers of Punjab
1956 births